David Andrés Salazar Bustamante (born 19 April 1999) is a Chilean footballer who plays as a forward for Magallanes on loan from O'Higgins in the Primera B de Chile.

International career
At under-20 level, Salazar represented Chile in both the 2018 South American Games, winning the gold medal, and the 2019 South American Championship.

Honours
Chile U20
 South American Games Gold medal: 2018

References

External links
 

1999 births
Living people
People from Cachapoal Province
Chilean footballers
Association football forwards
Chile youth international footballers
Chile under-20 international footballers
Chilean Primera División players
Primera B de Chile players
O'Higgins F.C. footballers
Deportes Santa Cruz footballers
Magallanes footballers
Deportes Magallanes footballers
South American Games gold medalists for Chile
South American Games medalists in football
Competitors at the 2018 South American Games
21st-century Chilean people